Francis Patrick Denis "Dapper Dan" Daley (August 28, 1908 - October 15, 1968) was a Canadian ice hockey player. In his career, which lasted from 1928 to 1945, he mainly played in various minor leagues, but also played 5 regular season and 2 playoff games for the Detroit Cougars of the National Hockey League in the 1928–29 season.

Career statistics

Regular season and playoffs

External links
 

1908 births
1968 deaths
Canadian ice hockey centres
Canadian ice hockey left wingers
Cleveland Barons (1937–1973) players
Cleveland Falcons players
Cleveland Indians (IHL) players
Detroit Cougars players
Detroit Olympics (IHL) players
Hershey Bears players
Ice hockey people from Ontario
London Tecumsehs players
Philadelphia Ramblers players
Seattle Ironmen players
Seattle Olympics players
Seattle Seahawks (ice hockey) players
Sportspeople from Thunder Bay
Springfield Indians players
St. Louis Flyers (AHA) players
Windsor Bulldogs (1929–1936) players
Canadian expatriate ice hockey players in the United States